The Contemporary Review of the Middle East is a peer-reviewed forum that publishes original research articles that analyse contemporary Middle Eastern developments in the fields of security, politics, economy and culture.

The journal is published four times a year by SAGE Publications (New Delhi) with a primary focus on contemporary developments.

This journal is a member of the Committee on Publication Ethics (COPE).

Abstracting and indexing 
Contemporary Review of the Middle East is abstracted and indexed in:
 Clarivate Analytics: Emerging Sources Citation Index (ESCI)
 DeepDyve
 Dutch-KB
 EBSCO
 J-Gate
 OCLC
 Ohio
 Portico
 ProQuest: IBSS
 RePEc
 SCOPUS
 UGC-CARE (GROUP II)

External links 
 
 Homepage

References 

 http://publicationethics.org/members/contemporary-review-middle-east=COPE
 https://web.archive.org/web/20160326121902/http://mei.org.in/front/cms/resources.php?cid=MTE=

SAGE Publishing academic journals
Publications established in 2014
Economics journals
Development studies journals